Oreta liensis is a moth in the family Drepanidae. It was described by Watson in 1967. It is found in China (Yunnan, Heilongjiang, Hubei, Fujian, Sichuan).

References

Moths described in 1967
Drepaninae